Louis V may refer to:

 Louis V of France (967–987)
 Louis IV, Holy Roman Emperor and V of Germany (1282–1347)
 Louis V, Duke of Bavaria (1315–1361)
 Louis V, Elector Palatine (ruled 1508–1544)
 Louis V, Landgrave of Hesse-Darmstadt (ruled 1596–1626)
 Louis Joseph, Prince of Condé (1736–1818)
 Louis Vuitton, luxury goods and fashion company, also its eponymous founder

Human name disambiguation pages